Susan Campbell Bartoletti (born 1958) is an American writer of children's literature whose work includes Kids on Strike! and Hitler Youth: Growing Up in Hitler's Shadow.

She was born in Harrisburg, Pennsylvania, but eventually the family ended up in a small town in northeastern Pennsylvania. She graduated from the University of Scranton in 1982.

Campbell Bartoletti began her career as an eighth-grade English teacher before deciding to pursue writing in earnest. Seeing her student write and create original work, she was inspired to create her own. In connection with her students, Susan said that "I felt immense satisfaction in watching my students grow as writers. I wanted to practice what I preached, so I joined a writers group and got serious about my own writing." She sold her first short story in 1989. Three years later, in 1992, Campbell Bartoletti published her first picture book, Silver at Night. She held a rigid routine, waking early in the morning in order to write before she left to teach. In 1997, she turned to writing full-time. Since then, her works have received a number of awards, including the NCTE Orbis Pictus Award for Nonfiction, the SCBWI Golden Kite Award for Nonfiction, the Jane Addams Children's Book Award, and the Newbery Honor in 2006.

She teaches writing classes at a number of MA and MFA programs, among them Spalding University in Louisville, Kentucky, and Hollins University in Roanoke, Virginia. Additionally, she leads workshops offered through the Highlights Foundation. She resides with her family in Moscow, Pennsylvania.

Works

Non-fiction
 Growing Up in Coal Country (1996)
 Kids on Strike! (1999)
 Black Potatoes: The Story of the Great Irish Famine, 1845 to 1850 (2001) - Robert F. Sibert Informational Book Medal winner, 2002
 The Flag Maker (2004) 
 Hitler Youth: Growing Up in Hitler's Shadow (2005) - a Newbery Honor Book 2006
  They Called Themselves The K.K.K : The Birth of an American Terrorist Group (2010)
 The Boy Who Dared (2008)

Fiction
 Silver at Night (1994)
 Dancing with Dziadziu (1997)
 No Man's Land: A Young Soldier's Story (1999)
 A Coal Miner's Bride : The Diary of Anetka Kaminska (2000), Dear America Series
 The Christmas Promise (2001), Blue Sky Press
 The Journal of Finn Reardon : A Newsie (2003), My Name is America Series
 Nobody's Nosier Than a Cat (2003)
 Nobody's Diggier than a Dog (2005)
 Naamah and the Ark at Night (2011)

References

External links
 
 

1958 births
Living people
American children's writers
Writing teachers
Novelists from Pennsylvania
21st-century American novelists
20th-century American women writers
21st-century American women writers
University of Scranton alumni
Spalding University faculty
Hollins University faculty
20th-century American non-fiction writers
American women children's writers
American women novelists
Kentucky women writers
Novelists from Virginia
Novelists from Kentucky
American women non-fiction writers
21st-century American non-fiction writers
American women academics
Newbery Honor winners